Katherine Jane Bracks (née Pickett) is an Australian reality television cook. She is the winner of the third series of MasterChef Australia.

Bracks, mother of three children, was previously a school teacher. She lives in Orange, New South Wales and attends Orange Evangelical Church. While on the show, Bracks refused to call the Dalai Lama "Your Holiness", saying that "My belief is that God is the only one that is perfectly holy." Her stance attracted media attention in India.

Released a cook book in 2012: The Sweet Life: Desserts from Australia's MasterChef.

After two years, when she had fulfilled her contractual obligations, Bracks returned to her work as a teacher.

References

External links

MasterChef Australia
1974 births
Living people
Australian television chefs
People from Orange, New South Wales
Participants in Australian reality television series
Reality cooking competition winners
Women chefs
Australian Christians